Fred Hale (born 17 July 1979) is a footballer from the Solomon Islands. He currently plays as a goalkeeper for Marist FC in the Honiara FA League. Between 2000 and 2007, he won 13 caps for the Solomon Islands national football team.

External links

1979 births
Living people
Solomon Islands footballers
Solomon Islands international footballers
Association football goalkeepers
2000 OFC Nations Cup players
2002 OFC Nations Cup players